Ali Quli is a Turkic-derived Muslim male given name meaning 'slave of Ali'.  It is built from quli. It is equivalent to Arabic-derived Abd al-Ali or Persian-derived Gholamali.

People
 Ali Quli Istajlu
 Aliquli Jabbadar
 Aliqoli Mirza Qajar
 Aliqoli Jadid-ol-Eslam
 Aliqoli Khan
 Ali Kuli Khan Khattak
 Ali Quli Khan Zaman
 Nawab Ali Quli Khan Bahadur (17th century), Subadar of Multan, Oudh, Orissa, Gujarat and Delhi
 Ali-Qoli Khan Bakhtiari